The Penobscot Building Annex is a 23-story,  office skyscraper located at 144 West Congress Street in Downtown Detroit, Michigan. This portion of the Penobscot Block is now physically connected to the newer Penobscot Building Tower.

The Penobscot Building Annex is a contributing property in the Detroit Financial Historic District, and on the National Register of Historic Places.

Architecture
The Penobscot Building Annex was designed by the architectural firm of Donaldson and Meier and completed in 1916. The building features a Renaissance-inspired theme, with the lower five stories faced with grey granite, and the upper section faced with lighter terra cotta and ashlar. The lower section of the facade contains broad triple windows; the upper part has pairs of double-hung windows. The top four stories are separated from the lower floors by a  band of terra cotta with blind reliefs. The entrance is flanked by retail shop windows, and more retail shops are located in the first-floor interior.

Gallery

See also
Penobscot Building (1905) — oldest
Penobscot Building — newest
List of tallest buildings in Detroit
National Register of Historic Places listings in Downtown and Midtown Detroit, Michigan

References

Further reading

External links

 Google Maps location of the Penobscot Annex

Skyscraper office buildings in Detroit
Commercial buildings completed in 1913
Historic district contributing properties in Michigan
National Register of Historic Places in Wayne County, Michigan
Office buildings on the National Register of Historic Places in Michigan
Chicago school architecture in Michigan
1913 establishments in Michigan